On 21 September 2001, an explosion occurred at the AZF (French initialism for AZote Fertilisant, i.e. nitrogen fertiliser) fertiliser factory in Toulouse, France, belonging to the Grande Paroisse branch of the Total group.

Three hundred tonnes of ammonium nitrate was stored (the maximum capacity was 2,000 tonnes) in hangar 221 222. The blast measured 3.4 on the Richter scale, with an estimated power equivalent to 20-40 tons of TNT. The explosion was heard 80 km (50 miles) away. Due to the acoustics of the hills and the large sound, the explosion was reported as occurring in multiple places. Police at first believed that at least five bombs had simultaneously gone off. There is still controversy over the exact number of explosions.

Around ten percent of the inhabitants of Toulouse had to be evacuated.

Victims
The disaster caused 31 deaths, about 30 seriously wounded, and 2,500 light casualties. Two thirds of the city's windows were shattered, causing 70 eye wounds. The total damages paid by insurance groups exceeded 1.5 billion euros.

Investigation

On 4 October 2001, France's then Environment Minister Yves Cochet announced that the explosion "may have been a terrorist attack" (the explosion occurred ten days after the September 11 attacks) and identified Hassan Jandoubi, a plant sub-contractor killed in the blast, as a person under investigation. French anti-terrorist authorities were prohibited by the Toulouse prosecutor from searching Jandoubi's house for five days after the incident.

Police declared that Jandoubi had "possible Islamic fundamentalist sympathies," yet by the time the search was finally conducted, they said that Jandoubi's girlfriend had disposed of all traces of his clothes and photos. Authorities described the delay as damaging to the investigation.

See also
List of ammonium nitrate disasters

References

Further reading
  Daniel Dissy : "AZF-Toulouse, Quelle vérité ?", 2006, Library of Congress Control No : 2007370387.
  Franck Hériot & Jean-Christian Tirat : "AZF: L'enquête assassinée",Plon. 
  Daniel Dissy : "AZF, l'Enquête secrète  - Le Mystère de la Trace Noire ou comment AZF a explosé", éditions des Traboules, Paris, 2009, .

External links

  Unofficial AZF website
  AZF -a judicial fiasco ? (French News, 8.Oct.2008)
  AZF: L'enquête assassinée
  Le Dossier AZF by Daniel Dissy

2001 disasters in France
2001 in France
2001 industrial disasters
21st century in Occitania (administrative region)
Ammonium nitrate disasters
Chemical plant explosions
Explosions in 2001
Explosions in France
Chemical factory explosion
Industrial accidents and incidents in France
Industrial fires and explosions
Man-made disasters in France
September 2001 events in France 
TotalEnergies